Broughton Hall may refer to:

United Kingdom

 Broughton Hall, Flintshire
 Broughton Hall, Merseyside
 Broughton Hall, North Yorkshire
 Broughton Hall, Staffordshire

Australia

Broughton Hall, Lilyfield, a heritage-listed former hospital in Lilyfield, New South Wales